The Kotokli Church or Church of the Holy Trinity is a Georgian Orthodox Church located in İngiloy Kötüklü village of Qakh District, northwestern Azerbaijan.Georgian Church leaders attended first Divine Liturgy since 1920 on 26 October 2019 in Church of the Holy Trinity.

See also
Lekarti Monastery

References

Eastern Orthodox churches in Azerbaijan